Esomus metallicus, sometimes known as striped flying barb (although the common name is usually reserved for Esomus lineatus), is a species of cyprinid found in Southeast Asia (Myanmar, Laos, Thailand, Cambodia, Vietnam, and Peninsular Malaysia), including the Salween, Mekong, and Chao Phraya river systems. It is found in fresh and brackish water. It grows to  standard length.

Utilization
Fishery: Trade
Aquarium: Trade

References

Esomus
Fish of the Mekong Basin
Fish of Cambodia
Fish of Laos
Freshwater fish of Malaysia
Fish of Myanmar
Fish of Thailand
Fish of Vietnam
Fish described in 1923
Taxa named by Ernst Ahl